Dachne is a place name in Ukraine which can refer to the following villages:
 Dachne, Bakhchisaray Raion, Crimea
 Dachne, Sudak Municipality, Crimea
 Dachne, Volyn Oblast
 Dachne, Vasylkivka Raion, Dnipropetrovsk Oblast
 Dachne, Mezhova Raion, Dnipropetrovsk Oblast
 Dachne, Shyroke Raion, Dnipropetrovsk Oblast
 Dachne, Donetsk Oblast
 Dachne, Svatove Raion, Luhansk Oblast
 Dachne, Slovianoserbsk Raion, Luhansk Oblast
 Dachne, Odessa Oblast
 Dachne, Kharkiv Oblast
 Dachne, Chernihiv Oblast

See also
 Dachny (disambiguation)